The Maldives National Congress is a political party in the Maldives.

The party's interim leader is Mohamed Naeem.

References

Social Liberal Party